The 2020 Michigan State Spartans football team represented Michigan State University during the 2020 NCAA Division I FBS football season. The Spartans competed as members of the East Division of the Big Ten Conference and played their home games at Spartan Stadium in East Lansing, Michigan. This was the program's first season under head coach Mel Tucker.

In a limited season, which was initially canceled due to the COVID-19 pandemic before being reinstated, the Spartans compiled a 2–5 record, all in conference games. On December 20, the program announced that it would not participate in any bowl game.

Previous season 
The Spartans finished the 2019 season 7–6, 4–5 in Big Ten play to finish in fifth place in the East Division. The Spartans received a bid to the 2019 Pinstripe Bowl where they defeated Wake Forest 27–21.

On February 4, 2020, the school announced that head coach Mark Dantonio had retired and Mike Tressel would be taking over as interim head coach for the Spartans. Tressel was previously the team's defensive coordinator. On February 12, the school announced the hiring of Colorado head coach Mel Tucker as the university's 25th head football coach.

Offseason

2020 NFL Draft 
MSU kept its streak of 80 years of having at least one player drafted in the NFL Draft when cornerback Josiah Scott was selected in the fourth round of the 2020 NFL Draft. 

Several other undrafted players signed free agent contracts with NFL teams:
Cody White, Wide Receiver, Kansas City Chiefs
Brian Lewerke, Quarterback, New England Patriots
Raequan Williams, Defensive Tackle, Philadelphia Eagles
Joe Bachie, Linebacker New Orleans Saints
Mike Panasiuk, Defensive Tackle, Las Vegas Raiders
Darrell Stewart Jr., Wide Receiver, Green Bay Packers
Tyler Higby, Offensive Line, Minnesota Vikings

Coaching changes 
After Dantonio abruptly retired in March, new head coach Mel Tucker took approximately 10 days to assemble his assistants for the season. Tucker brought with him from his Colorado staff offensive coordinator Jay Johnson, offensive line coach Chris Kapilovic, running backs coach William Peagler, and special teams coordinator Ross Els. Former Spartan wide receiver Courtney Hawkins was named the wide receivers coach, Ted Gilmore the tight ends coach, and Scottie Hazelton the defensive coordinator. Former MSU defensive coach Harlon Barnett returned to coach the secondary after spending two seasons as the defensive coordinator at Florida State. Ron Burton (defensive line) and Mike Tressel (safeties) were the only holdovers from Dantonio's staff.

Recruiting

Preseason

Preseason Big Ten poll
Although the Big Ten Conference has not held an official preseason poll since 2010, Cleveland.com has polled sports journalists representing all member schools as a de facto preseason media poll since 2011. For the 2020 poll, Michigan State was projected to finish in fifth in the East Division.

COVID-19 effects on season 
On July 9, 2020, the Big Ten announced that member teams will only play conference games in effort to reduce issues related to the ongoing COVID-19 pandemic. On July 24, the school announced that the entire team, which had returned to campus for voluntary workouts, was being placed on a 14-day quarantine after two staff members and one player tested positive for COVID-19.

On August 11, 2020, the Big Ten canceled the college football season for the fall of 2020 due to the continuing COVID-19 pandemic. On September 16, the conference reversed course and announced that a season would be played. Teams would begin play on October 24. On September 19, the conference announced an eight-game schedule.

One game, against Maryland, was canceled due to the school's COVID-19 outbreak. A scheduled rematch on December 19 as part of the Big Ten Champions Week was also canceled due to continued COVID-19 issues at Maryland.

Personnel

Roster

Coaching staff

Schedule
Michigan State's 2020 schedule originally was planned to begin with a conference home game against Northwestern, followed by three non-conference opponents: the independent BYU Cougars, Toledo of the Mid-American Conference, and finally Miami of the ACC. The non-conference slate was canceled on July 9 due to the Big Ten Conference's decision to play a conference-only schedule due to the COVID-19 pandemic.

On August 4, the Big Ten Conference announced the schedule for all Big Ten teams. In conference play, the Spartans were play all members of the East Division, as well as Northwestern, Iowa, and Minnesota from the West Division. The season was canceled by the conference on August 11, 2020.

On September 19, the conference changed course and announced a new, revised, eight-game schedule. A ninth game will be played the week of December 19 where the first place teams in each division will play for the Big Ten Championship, while the remaining teams will play the same-seeded team in the opposite division.

On November 19, it was announced that the November 21 game against Maryland had been canceled as all team-related activities were paused because of an elevated number of coronavirus cases within the Terrapins' program. A rescheduled game against Maryland as part of Big Ten Champions Week was also canceled due to COVID-19 issues at Maryland.

Rankings

Radio
Radio coverage for all games will be broadcast statewide on the Spartans Sports Network

Game summaries

Rutgers

MSU opened the 2020 season at home against Rutgers. Rutgers scored on their first possession, moving 75 yards before Isiah Pacheco rushed for a 12-yard touchdown to give the Scarlet Knights the early 7–0 lead. MSU quickly turned the ball over to Rutgers on their first offensive play as Jayden Reed fumbled and the Knights took over at MSU's 44. The Spartan defense forced a three-and-out, but the offense again turned the ball over as Rocky Lombardi fumbled the ball and Rutgers took over at the MSU four-yard line. A one-yard touchdown run a few plays later put the Knights up 14–0 with just under seven minutes remaining in the quarter. MSU's offense took the ensuing kickoff at mid-field and moved to the Rutgers' 42-yard line. However, MSU turned the ball over again, this time on downs, failing to get the first down on a fourth and three play. After a Rutgers' punt, Lombardi hit Reed on a 50-yard pass to bring MSU within seven points. Another Knights' punt gave MSU the ball with 14 minutes remaining in the second quarter. However, once again, the MSU offense turned the ball over as Lombardi was intercepted and Rutgers took over inside the MSU 30-yard line. Two plays later, a Rutgers' 24-yard touchdown run moved the Knights' lead to 21–7. MSU answered with an 11-play drive that moved into Rutgers territory, but another Jayden Reed fumble gave the ball back to Rutgers with less than eight minutes remaining in the half. MSU took the ball back on an interception by Shakur Brown and MSU notched a field goal to draw within 21–10. With just over three minutes remaining in the half, Rutgers pushed the lead to 28–10 with a three-yard touchdown run. Matt Coghlin hit his second field goal of the game as time expired to make the score 28–13 at the half.

On the first possession of the second half, MSU again turned the ball over on a Jordan Simmons fumble. Rutgers could not capitalize and punted the ball back to MSU. MSU was forced to punt, but a Rutgers fumble on the punt gave MSU the ball at the Rutgers 30. Jalen Nailor scored on the next play, a 30-yard touchdown catch to narrow the lead to 28–20. A Rutgers' fumble on their ensuing possession set MSU up at the 29-yard line. However, the Spartans were again stopped on a fourth down run, turning the ball over on downs. A Rutgers' field goal to start the fourth quarter pushed the Knights' lead to 31–20. The teams exchanged punts before Rutgers put the game out of reach with a 14-yard touchdown pass with just under five minutes remaining in the game. Another Jayden Reed touchdown catch brought the Spartans within 11. A Rutgers' punt preceded another turnover, the seventh in the game, as Lombardi was intercepted with under 40 seconds remaining. The Knights were able to run out the clock as the Spartans fell 38–27.

Michigan

In their first road game of the season, the Spartans traveled to face their rival, Michigan, for the Paul Bunyan Trophy. Despite being a multiple touchdown underdog, the Spartans took the early lead after each team traded punts when Rocky Lombardi hit Ricky White for a 30-yard touchdown pass. However, Michigan quickly responded by scoring on an 11-yard touchdown run following an eight-play drive to tie the game at seven. Each team again was forced to punt on their next two possessions as the game moved to the second quarter. Lombardi put the Spartans up again on a two-yard touchdown pass to Connor Heyward moving the Spartan lead to 14–7. Again, each team traded punts before the Wolverines settled for a field goal with 2:49 remaining in the half. Another exchange of punts left MSU with the ball with less than a minute remaining in the half as they ran out the clock to go to halftime with the three-point lead.

In the second half, Michigan punted on their first possession and the Spartans moved the ball into Wolverine territory on the ensuing possession, but settled for another Matt Coghlin field goal to extend the lead to 17–10. Michigan tied it on their next possession with a one-yard touchdown run to put the score at 17–17. MSU retook the lead on their next possession as Coghlin connected on a 51-yard field goal to move MSU into the lead at 20–17. Following a Michigan punt, MSU moved to the Wolverine 23, but Coghlin missed a 40-yard field goal that would have moved the Spartan lead to six points. Michigan again failed to move the ball and was forced to punt on their next possession. Following the punt, MSU took over at their own eight-yard line with just under 10 minutes remaining in the game. The Spartans, helped by a Ricky White 31 yard reception, moved to the Michigan 13 with just over five minutes remaining. Lombardi then hit Heyward again for a 13-yard touchdown catch and run to push the Spartan lead to 10 at 27–17. The Wolverines scored on their next possession, but the 18-play drive took over four and a half minutes and left less than 40 seconds remaining on the clock while the Spartans held a 27–24 lead. The onside kick was recovered by Heyward and Lombardi gave the Spartans on a fourth down sneak to run out the clock as the Spartans defeated their rivals 27–24. The win moved MSU to 1–1 on the season.

Iowa

at Indiana

Northwestern

Ohio State

Penn State

References

Michigan State
Michigan State Spartans football seasons
Michigan State Spartans football